Mario Sačer (born 17 November 1990 in Varaždin) is a Croatian football striker who plays for Draskovec after spending several seasons at NK Varaždin.

Career
Sačer started playing football at 6 years of age for his hometown club Drava Sveti Đurđ, moving soon to Podravina in nearby Ludbreg and finally joining the youth ranks of Varteks in 2000. He came into the spotlight playing for the Varteks U-19 team, when he was named the best player and scorer of the Prva HNL Academy for the 2008–2009 season, amassing an impressive tally of 32 goals and 14 assists in 30 games, 11 goals more than the runners-up Andrej Kramarić and Valentino Stepčić. He made his first team debut for Varteks in May 2009, entering for the last 8 minutes in the game versus Osijek.

He joined the ranks of Hajduk Split, of which he stated to be an avid fan, in late June 2009. Not breaking through initially to the first team, he was sent on loan back to Varteks during the winter transfer season, losing, however, his place in the team in mid-March, due to the dispute of his two clubs regarding the transfer fee, but returning to the first team in May, scoring two goals in the last three games of the season. He remained on loan with his hometown club, which had changed its name from NK Varteks to NK Varaždin, for the first half of the 2010–11 season, finding his position moved more and more moved to the right wing, and unable to regain his scoring streak. Returning to Hajduk Split, he was again sidelined, playing in only two games, one of which was 90 minutes against his former club. The following summer, he was again sent on loan to Varaždin for the 2011–12 season. After a series of moves, he returned to his hometown in 2017, playing for the new NK Varaždin, unassociated with the club he played with at the start of his career, which folded in 2015.

He had a spell at Austrian lower league side FC Trofaiach during the COVID-19 year.

References

External links
 

1990 births
Living people
Sportspeople from Varaždin
Association football forwards
Croatian footballers
Croatia youth international footballers
Croatia under-21 international footballers
NK Varaždin players
HNK Hajduk Split players
ND Mura 05 players
NK Istra 1961 players
FK Partizani Tirana players
NK Međimurje players
NK Dugopolje players
Croatian Football League players
Slovenian PrvaLiga players
Kategoria Superiore players
First Football League (Croatia) players
Austrian 2. Landesliga players
Croatian expatriate footballers
Expatriate footballers in Slovenia
Croatian expatriate sportspeople in Slovenia
Expatriate footballers in Albania
Croatian expatriate sportspeople in Albania
Expatriate footballers in Austria
Croatian expatriate sportspeople in Austria